The 2019–20 Liga Națională season is the 70th season of the Liga Națională, the highest professional basketball league in Romania. This will be the season with a new format, with 16 teams divided into two groups based on results from the previous season. CSM U Oradea were the defending champions. 

On 13 March 2020, the league was suspended until 31 March because of the COVID-19 pandemic.

Teams 
After withdrawing of Târgu Mureș, ACS Târgu Jiu replaced them in the competition.

Group A

Group B

Regular season

Group A

Group B

Second stage

Red Group

League table

Results

Yellow Group

League table

Results

Blue Group

League table

Results

Romanian clubs in European competitions

References 

2019-20
Romanian
Lea